The abuse of Kylie Freeman was a case of child sexual abuse perpetrated, recorded, and distributed by the victim's father, Kenneth Freeman.

Divorced from her mother, Kenneth Freeman abused his pre-teen daughter for 14 months in Washington and Oregon, recording and distributing it online.  Kylie Freeman was in her mid-teens when she first revealed the abuse to her mother; within a year, she spoke about it on the TV series America's Most Wanted.  Despite fleeing to mainland China, Kenneth Freeman was captured in 2007 and tried through early 2009.  Facing federal and state charges, Freeman was convicted on multiple related counts and sentenced to 50 years imprisonment.  His third wife was tried and sentenced for assisting his flight from justice.  Kylie Freeman attended college, has advocated for sexual assault victims, and was party to litigation and sentencing of perpetrators caught with recordings of her abuse.

Background

Kenneth John Freeman was born on June 21, 1962 in Virginia. Also called Ken Freeman, he is a former Hanford nuclear plant guard; Hanford, Washington patrol officer; and Benton County, Washington Sheriff's Office reserve deputy. In 2008, the Houston Chronicle called him a "computer adviser" and bodybuilder.

Gaye divorced Kenneth Freeman in April 1993. In 1994, Freeman married Melissa L. Moscatelli, and they divorced in October 1999

Sexual abuse
Beginning in 2000 when she was ten years old, Kylie Freeman was sexually abused by her father; the preteen "was forced […] to dress up like a hooker and say dirty words to a video camera and was bound by ropes and repeatedly raped."  These crimes were recorded as both photos and videos that were posted online as the "Vicky series, […] the most viewed images of child pornography of all times."  This lasted for 14 months until Kylie Freeman's "spirit was broken".

In November 2005, by which time teenaged Kylie Freeman was suicidal, a family viewing of Forrest Gump recovered the repressed memories, and Freeman finally told her mother about the abuse.  The subsequent police investigation uncovered some Vicky-series material on Kylie Freeman's own computer, believed to have been put there by her father.  A year later, she appeared on the December 19, 2006 episode of America's Most Wanted and told of what her father had perpetrated, placing the previously "provincial affair" in the national spotlight.  With this exposure, the National Center for Missing & Exploited Children was able to link the Vicky series to the victim and perpetrator.

Capture of Kenneth Freeman

Kenneth Freeman was living in Seattle when he was due to be tried in Benton County, Washington for "three counts of first-degree rape of a child" on March 24, 2006. That day, the former law-enforcer instead fled to mainland China to avoid prosecution, and was subsequently placed on the most wanted lists of the United States Marshals Service and Immigration and Customs Enforcement (ICE). While in China, Freeman wrote a 400-page autobiography that included confessions to his crimes.

Found living in Suzhou, authorities waited to arrest Freeman until he transited to Hong Kong, because the US had no extradition treaty with the government of China, but did with the government of Hong Kong.  On the evening of May 1, 2007, Freeman was caught at the Lok Ma Chau Control Point.  He injured himself and four local police with the ensuing fight.  Four months later, he agreed to US extradition, and returned to the United States on October 18, 2007 (via Fairchild Air Force Base).

Prosecution

In the United States District Court for the Eastern District of Washington, Kenneth Freeman was tried under Judge Lonny R. Suko on one federal charge of producing child pornography in Washington, and two Oregonian charges: possessing child pornography and "interstate transportation of a minor for purposes of engaging in unlawful sexual activities."  Freeman pled guilty to all three charges in December 2008.

As part of a cross-jurisdictional plea bargain, Freeman was sentenced on March 25, 2009 to 50 years imprisonment; Judge Suko told Freeman that if the felon was ever released from prison, he would be aged in his mid-80s.  Two hours later, at the Spokane County Superior Court, Freeman was also sentenced to 20 concurrent years of imprisonment for the 2006 Benton County charges.  He is forbidden from profiting off his life story, and is subject to a lifetime restraining order prohibiting any contact with his daughter.   he was prisoner number 12163-085, imprisoned at the United States Penitentiary, Marion with a release date of December 5, 2049.

Accessory prosecution
Upon returning to the US from China, she was arrested by ICE the day after Freeman was caught in Hong Kong. She ultimately pled guilty to making false statements and aiding and abetting her husband's flee from custody. On November 29, 2007, she was sentenced to six months house arrest, 240 hours of community service, and three years probation. The Freemans divorced in April 2008.

Kylie Freeman
According to The Spokesman-Review, during the search, trial, and conviction of her father, Kylie Freeman had "not shied away from being publicly identified."  She became a public advocate for sexual assault victims by sharing her story and teaching that they're not alone in their struggles.  By March 2009, she was a freshman at college.

Restitution
In November 2007, Joseph Kennedy (born in ) was found with a laptop containing "thousands of images of child pornography", including 48 of Freeman. At Kennedy's February 2010 sentencing, he was ordered by Judge Richard A. Jones to pay Freeman  as allowed by the "Mandatory Restitution for Sex Crimes" section of the Violence Against Women Act.

In June 2016, she filed suit against J. Lee Anderson III of Macon, Georgia who had been convicted in 2009 of downloading Vicky series media. Anderson’s was her fifth such lawsuit against downloaders; she sought .

See also

References

2000 crimes in the United States
2001 crimes in the United States
2006 crimes in the United States
America's Most Wanted
child pornography
child sexual abuse in the United States
crimes committed by law enforcement
crimes in Oregon
crimes in Washington (state)
escapes in the United States
incestual abuse